Flossie & the Fox is a 1986 picture book by Patricia C. McKissack about a girl, Flossie, who takes some eggs to a neighbor, meets a fox on the way and manages to outwit it. In 1991, a film adaptation of the book was made with the author narrating.

Reception
Kirkus Reviews, in a starred review of Flossie & the Fox, wrote "Isadora's watercolor, ink and pencil illustrations fully realize the spirit of the text, with Flossie's sturdy, self-reliant stance and the fox growing progressively more tentative and defensive. Mellow green, lemon, rust and earth tones fill a safe, sun-dappled world." and called it "A perfect picture book" School Library Journal wrote "The language is true, and the illustrations are marvelously complementary in their interpretation of the events. This spirited little girl will capture readers from the beginning, and they'll adore her by the end of this delightful story."

Flossie & the Fox has also been reviewed by  Booklist, and Publishers Weekly.

It is a 1986 Horn Book Fanfare Book,

Analysis 
In discussing literary innovations in diverse children's literature, scholar Jonda C. McNair explores how the dialogue present in Patricia C. McKissack'a Flossie & the Fox portrays African American English Vernacular in a positive light, linking its use to a clever character that is able to outsmart the fox who speaks standard English.

See also

Little Red Riding Hood

References

External links
Library holdings of Flossie & the fox
"Around the world with tricksters" - School Library Journal article that lists trickster tales including Flossie & the fox

1986 children's books
American picture books
Works based on Little Red Riding Hood
Books about foxes
Literature featuring anthropomorphic foxes
Dial Press books
Books by Patricia McKissack
Picture books based on fairy tales